Gorsty Knoll is a small hamlet, located in the Forest of Dean, Gloucestershire, England. The internationally important remains of Darkhill Ironworks and the Titanic Steelworks, are located on the edge of the hamlet. Gorsty Knoll is also famed for its glow worms.

References

Villages in Gloucestershire
Forest of Dean